The Oath: The Obama White House and the Supreme Court is a 2012 book by Jeffrey Toobin describing the Roberts Court and President Obama's interactions with it.

Notes and references

External links
Amazon Listing for The Oath

2012 non-fiction books
Books about politics of the United States
Supreme Court of the United States
Doubleday (publisher) books
Books about the Obama administration